Edward Greer (July 29, 1863 – February 14, 1890) was an American outfielder in Major League Baseball. He played for the Baltimore Orioles, Philadelphia Athletics, and Brooklyn Grays from 1885 to 1887.

External links

Baseball Almanac

1863 births
1890 deaths
19th-century baseball players
Major League Baseball outfielders
Baltimore Orioles (AA) players
Philadelphia Athletics (AA) players
Brooklyn Grays players
Littlestown (minor league baseball) players
Toronto Canucks players
Baseball players from Philadelphia
Tuberculosis deaths in Pennsylvania
19th-century deaths from tuberculosis